Roberto Paliska (born 14 December 1963 in Rijeka) is a Croatian former football player. 

Although born in Rijeka, he is originally from Labin.

Statistics

Player

References

External links
 Profile at Playerhistory. 
 hrepka.com
 Foreign players in Greece at RSSSF.
 Profile at Strukljeva.net

1963 births
Living people
People from Labin
Footballers from Rijeka
Association football defenders
Yugoslav footballers
Croatian footballers
HNK Rijeka players
Pierikos F.C. players
WSG Tirol players
FC Kärnten players
FC St. Veit players
Yugoslav First League players
Super League Greece players
2. Liga (Austria) players
Croatian Football League players
Austrian Regionalliga players
Croatian expatriate footballers
Expatriate footballers in Greece
Croatian expatriate sportspeople in Greece
Expatriate footballers in Austria
Croatian expatriate sportspeople in Austria